The white-chinned woodcreeper (Dendrocincla merula) is a species of bird in the Dendrocolaptinae subfamily.
It is found in Bolivia, Brazil, Colombia, Ecuador, French Guiana, Guyana, Peru, Suriname, and Venezuela.
Its natural habitat is subtropical or tropical moist lowland forests.

References

white-chinned woodcreeper
Birds of the Amazon Basin
Birds of the Guianas
white-chinned woodcreeper
Birds of Brazil
Taxonomy articles created by Polbot